The Socialist United Party of Russia (USPR or SEPR; ; Sotsialisticheskaya yedinaya partiya Rossii, SEPR) was a socialist political party in Russia established in 2003, that succeeded the Spiritual Heritage movement. In the 2003 legislative elections it was part of the Rodina coalition that won 9.2 percent of the vote and 37 of the 450 seats in the Duma. In 2007 the party merged into Just Russia.

References

2003 establishments in Russia
2008 disestablishments in Russia
A Just Russia
Defunct socialist parties in Russia
Formerly registered political parties in Russia
Political parties disestablished in 2008
Political parties established in 2003